Charles Joseph O'Reilly (January 4, 1860 – February 4, 1923) was a Canadian-born American prelate of the Catholic Church. He served as the first bishop of the Diocese of Baker City in Oregon (1903–1918) and later the third bishop of the Diocese of Lincoln in Nebraska (1918–1923).

Early life
O'Reilly was born on January 4, 1860, in Saint John, New Brunswick, to Peter and Bridget (née Walsh) O'Reilly. He was not the only one in his family who chose a religious life; his sister Margaret joined the Visitation Sisters in Tacoma.

O'Reilly received his early education under the Christian Brothers in Saint John.  He then attended St. Joseph's College in Memramcook, New Brunswick, graduating with a Master of Arts degree. 

In 1884, O'Reilly moved with his family to the United States, settling in Portland, Oregon. He served as principal of St. Michael's College in Portland until 1885, when the Christian Brothers took charge of the school.O'Reilly studied for the priesthood at the Grand Seminary in Montreal, Quebec.

Priesthood
After returning to Portland, O'Reilly was ordained into the Archdiocese of Portland on June 29, 1890, by Archbishop William Gross. 

Following his ordination, O'Reilly served at missions in Lake Oswego and Tigard, Oregon, erecting churches at both locations. He was later named pastor of Immaculate Heart of Mary Parish in the Albina neighborhood of Portland in 1894. During his pastorate, he established himself as "a firm believer in total abstinence" and founded a boys' club to keep young men from "frequenting the saloons and other resorts."

In addition to his pastoral duties, O'Reilly became editor of the Catholic Sentinel, the newspaper of the Archdiocese of Portland, in 1900.

Bishop of Baker City 
On June 25, 1903, O'Reilly was appointed the bishop of the newly erected Bishop of Baker City by Pope Leo XIII.  O'Reilly received his episcopal consecration on August 25, 1903, from Archbishop Alexander Christie, with Bishops Alphonse Glorieux and Edward O'Dea serving as co-consecrators.

The new diocese consisted of more than 65,000 square miles east of the Cascade Mountains, which O'Reilly described as "terra incognita". It was said that Archbishop Christie had relegated discontented priests to eastern Oregon. This seemed to be confirmed upon O'Reilly's arrival in Baker City, when he was greeted by four armed priests. When O'Reilly tried to reassign one of those priests, Louis P. Desmarais, he refused.  O'Reilly had to forcibly eject him from the church property; Desmarais responded by trying to sue O'Reilly for assault and battery.

O'Reilly laid the cornerstone of Saint Francis de Sales Cathedral in Baker in 1906, dedicating the building in 1908. He also completed a new 115-bed facility for St. Elizabeth Hospital in Baker in 1915. With financial assistance from the Catholic Church Extension Society, he increased the number of parishes in the diocese from six in 1903 to 25 in 1918.

Bishop of Lincoln
O'Reilly was named the third bishop of Lincoln on March 20, 1918, by Pope Benedict XV. As opposed to his arrival in Baker City, he received a comparatively warm welcome in Lincoln, Nebraska, with a reception attended by Governor Keith Neville.

Early into his tenure at Lincoln, O'Reilly had to contend with the 1918 influenza pandemic, which claimed the lives of many priests and religious sisters. He traveled to Rome in 1921 to recruit more priests, especially for the large Czech-speaking population in the diocese. During his five years as bishop, he established six new parochial schools and three new parishes.

Already suffering from arteriosclerosis, O'Reilly fell in December 1922, leaving him confined to St. Elizabeth's Hospital in Lincoln for the final two months of his life. Charles O'Reilly died in Lincoln on February 4, 1923, at age 63.

References

1860 births
1923 deaths
Canadian emigrants to the United States
Roman Catholic Archdiocese of Portland in Oregon
Roman Catholic bishops of Baker
Roman Catholic bishops of Lincoln
20th-century Roman Catholic bishops in the United States